The 2017 Rebisco PSL All-Filipino Conference was the third conference and second indoor tournament for the Philippine Super Liga's fifth season. The games began on June 6, 2017 with the formal opening ceremonies taking place on June 10, 2017 at the Filoil Flying V Centre, San Juan.

The tournament adopted a new format. Those on the same group will figure in a single round robin. The top two teams in Pool A and Pool B shall comprise Pool C while the bottom two teams in Pools A and B comprising Pool D. There would be a crossover quarterfinal battle between members of Pools C and D with the surviving teams figuring in the semi-finals to determine the finalists.

PSL chairman Philip Ella Juico announced that half of the ticket sales for the June 6 and 8 games will be donated to Ian Lariba, the 2016 Summer Olympics competitor who has been diagnosed with acute myeloid leukemia.

On July 14, 2017, a day after the Petron Blaze Spikers won the tournament, PSL president Tats Suzara announced that Petron will play in the 2017 Macau Invitational Women’s Volleyball Tournament to be held on September 23 to 25, 2017 in Macau.

Teams

Preliminary round

Pool A

|}

|}

Pool B

|}

|}

Pool C

|}

|}

Pool D

|}

|}

Playoffs

Bracket

Quarterfinals

|}

5th to 8th classification

|}

7th place

|}

5th place

|}

Semifinals

|}

Bronze match

|}

Finals

|}

Final standing

Individual awards

Venues
Filoil Flying V Arena (main venue)

"Spike on Tour" Venues:
Bacoor City Strike Gym (June 15)
Batangas City Convention Center (June 24)
Baliwag Star Arena (June 27)
Imus Sports Center (July 4)
Muntinlupa Sports Complex (July 6)
De La Salle Lipa Sentrum (July 8)

Broadcast partners
Sports5: AksyonTV, TV5,  Hyper (SD and HD), Sports5.ph

References

All-Filipino
PSL